Gideon Striker (c. 1825 – October 6, 1886) was an Ontario businessman and political figure. He represented Prince Edward in the Legislative Assembly of Ontario as a Liberal member from 1872 to 1883.

He was born in Prince Edward County circa 1825 and educated in Picton. He was a druggist and sold groceries as well. Striker also served as reeve of Picton, warden for the county and lieutenant-colonel in the local militia. He was elected in 1871 to the provincial assembly but the election was declared invalid; he lost the subsequent by-election to James Simeon McCuaig but was declared elected later in 1872. He died suddenly in Montreal in 1886.

References

External links 

The Canadian parliamentary companion, 1883, JA Gemmill

Ontario Liberal Party MPPs
People from Prince Edward County, Ontario
1825 births
1886 deaths